Palaemon maculatus is a species of shrimp of the family Palaemonidae. The species can be found in the Niger Delta and is of commercial importance.

References

Crustaceans described in 2005
Palaemonidae
Commercial crustaceans